Khajurgachhi  is a village development committee in Jhapa District in the Province No. 1 of south-eastern Nepal. At the time of the 2001 Nepal census it had a population of 7471 people living in 1544 individual households.

References

Populated places in Jhapa District